Charles Gough Howell (1894 – 12 September 1942) was a Welsh lawyer and British colonial official, who served as Attorney General of Fiji from 1931 to 1933, and as Attorney-General of Singapore from 1936 to 1942.

Early life and family background
Howell was the son of William Gough Howell. He was educated at Cambridge University, and was subsequently admitted to the bar in London.

Sometime before 15 June 1918, he was married to Sidney Gretchen Innes-Noad of Australia, with whom he had a daughter, Rosemary (born 1920–1921). They also had a son, William Gough (Bill) (1922–1974), an Oxford-educated architect who served in the Royal Air Force in the Middle East during the Second World War.

Military service
On 23 November 1914, Howell was named a temporary Lieutenant in the Royal Field Artillery. He served in this role from 1914 through 1917, and again in 1925. He was seriously wounded in the Battle of Loos.

Legal and political career
After a brief period as Acting Solicitor General of Kenya (from December 1928 to 9 June 1930), Howell became Attorney General of Fiji and an ex officio member of the Legislative Council on 16 November 1931. His appointment coincided with that of James Russell (Director of Education).

He was confirmed as a nominated member of the Legislative Council in 1933. His reappointment coincided with the appointment of Arthur Leopold Armstrong (Acting Secretary for Native Affairs), Wilfred Wise (Commissioner of Works), and Lieutenant Colonel Joseph Samuel Gamble (Inspector General of Constabulary, and Commandant, Fiji Defence Force).

After being appointed Attorney General of Singapore on 11 August 1936, he was named His Majesty's Counsel for the Straits Settlements on 13 July 1937. He remained Attorney General until 14 February 1942.

Death
Howell was taken prisoner of war by Japan during the Second World War. He died of dysentery in Taiwan Camp, Formosa, on either 12 September 1942

References

Attorneys General of the Colony of Fiji
Attorneys-general of Fiji
Attorneys-General of Singapore
Ethnic minority members of the Legislative Council of Fiji
1894 births
1942 deaths
People from Cardiff
British Western Pacific Territories people
Welsh people who died in prison custody
British people in British Kenya
British people in British Fiji
British people in British Malaya
Alumni of the University of Cambridge
Deaths from dysentery
Solicitors general
British Army personnel of World War I
Royal Field Artillery officers
British people who died in Japanese internment camps